Woodford is an unincorporated community and census-designated place (CDP) in Lafayette County, Wisconsin, United States. Woodford is south of Argyle, in the town of Wiota. Woodford has a post office with ZIP code 53599. As of the 2010 census, its population is 69.

Geography
Woodford is in eastern Lafayette County, in the eastern part of the town of Woodford.

References

Census-designated places in Lafayette County, Wisconsin
Census-designated places in Wisconsin